Hortensis may refer to:
 Anemone hortensis, a plant that has mauve flowers
 Arion hortensis, also known by its common name the "garden slug"
 Atriplex hortensis, a hardy, annual plant
 Majorana hortensis, a somewhat cold-sensitive perennial herb
 Sylvia hortensis, western Orphean warbler
 Eisenia hortensis or European nightcrawler, a medium-small earthworm
 Cepaea hortensis or the White-lipped snail, a common land snail